Army Welfare Education Society (AWES)  manages and ensures proper education facilities to children of  Indian Army personnel through Local Military Authorities. Established in 1983, the society has its office  at Shankar Vihar, Delhi Cantonment and over the years has opened over 137 Army Public Schools and 249 Army Pre Primary Schools across India. It has 12 professional institutions of higher education. A list of colleges and schools including Army Public Schools all across the nation in many cities, colleges pertaining to engineering, medicals, dental, management, law etc.

Institutions of AWES
 Army Institute Of Management & Technology (A.I.M.T), Greater Noida, established 2004
 Army College of Dental Sciences, Secunderabad
 Army College of Medical Sciences, New Delhi
 Army Institute of Management, Kolkata
 Army Institute of Technology, Pune
 Army Institute of Fashion Design, Bangalore
 Army Institute of Hotel Management & Catering Technology, Bangalore
 Army Institute of Law
 Indian Army Public Schools
 Army Institute of Education, Greater Noida

References

External links 
 
 List of AWES Institutes

Indian Army
Educational organisations based in India
Organisations based in Delhi
Indian Army Public Schools
Organizations established in 1983
1983 establishments in Delhi